"All I Can Do" is a song written and recorded by American country music artist Dolly Parton.  It was released in July 1976 as the second single and title track from the album All I Can Do. At the country singles chart, the song topped in Canada, and reached number 3 in USA.

Chart performance
Weekly

Year-End

References

External links

All I Can Do lyrics at Dolly Parton On-Line

1976 singles
1976 songs
Dolly Parton songs
Songs written by Dolly Parton
RCA Records singles